Treamis is a Kindergarten to 12th grade, co-educational day and boarding international school located near Electronics City in Bangalore, India.  

Treamis International School offers International Baccalaureate Programme and International General Certificate of Secondary Education (IGCSE, UK-Cambridge) and GCE Advanced Level from Cambridge Assessment International Education. Treamis World School offers CBSE

The school has separate residential facilities for boys and girls.

See also 
 Sarala Birla Academy
 Mallya Aditi International School

External links
 Official website of Treamis

Boarding schools in Karnataka
Cambridge schools in India
Educational institutions established in 2007
International schools in Bangalore
2007 establishments in Karnataka